Nizhniye Lekandy (Tübänge Läkände; , Tübän Lekände) is a rural locality (a village) in Nagadaksky Selsoviet, Aurgazinsky District, Bashkortostan, Russia. The population was 234 as of 2010. There are 4 streets.

Geography 
Nizhniye Lekandy is located 44 km northeast of Tolbazy (the district's administrative centre) by road. Malaya Ivanovka is the nearest rural locality.

References 

Rural localities in Aurgazinsky District